Mojżesz David Kirszbraun (1903–1942) was a Polish mathematician, mostly known for the Kirszbraun theorem on extensions of Lipschitz maps. This theorem appears in his master's thesis, defended in Warsaw in 1930.

Kirszbraun finished school in 1922. Together with his classmate Adolf Lindenbaum, he continued his studies in Warsaw University. Later, he worked as an actuary in an insurance company.
He died in a ghetto in 1942.

Publications

References
 An entry about Kirszbraun written by Edward Marczewski, Polski słownik biograficzny, Tom XII, p. 486

20th-century Polish mathematicians
Polish Jews who died in the Holocaust
1942 deaths
Year of birth uncertain
1903 births